is a monthly manga magazine published by Shinshokan that specializes in boys' love (BL) manga. It has two sister publications: the quarterly BL light novel magazine , and the bimonthly BL manga magazine .

History
Dear+ was founded in 1997 as a companion magazine to Shinshokan's manga magazine Wings, which focuses on shōjo manga (manga for girls). As a magazine focused on BL (male-male romance), Dear+ was established to publish material considered too explicit for publication in Wings. Initially established as a quarterly magazine, Dear+ has been published monthly since 2003. 

Shōsetsu Dear+ was established in 1998 as a magazine publishing serialized BL light novels. Chéri+ was established in 2011 as a BL magazine published triannually (thrice per year) before becoming a quarterly publication in 2014.

To commemorate the 20th anniversary of Dear+ in 2017, an exhibition was held at the Parco Museum in Ikebukuro. The exhibition featured original artwork from 53 artists, as well as smartphone-enabled augmented reality elements. The program was hosted by Toshiki Masuda and Yoshiki Nakajima.

Serializations
The following is a partial list of titles serialized in Dear+, Shōsetsu Dear+, and Chéri+.

Dear+
Current
Hey, Class President! by Kaori Monchi (since 2003; on hiatus)
Kuroneko Kareshi by Aya Sakyō (since 2012)
Therapy Game: Restart by Meguru Hinohara (since 2019)

Concluded
Dear Myself by Eiki Eiki (1998)
Electric Hands by Taishi Zaō (1998)
Color by Eiki Eiki and Taishi Zaō (1999)
World's End by Eiki Eiki (1999)
Jazz by Sakae Maeda and Tamotsu Takamure (1999–2000)
Camera, Camera, Camera by Kazura Matsumoto (2002–2003)
Koi wa Ina Mono Myōna Mono by Taishi Zaō (2002)
Beyond My Touch by Tomo Maeda (2003)
Brilliant Blue by Saemi Yorita (2004–2005)
Ze by Yuki Shimizu (2004–2011)
Living for Tomorrow by Taishi Zaō (2005)
Boys Love by Kaim Tachibana (2007)
Ten Count by Rihito Takarai (2013–2017)
Secret XXX by Meguru Hinohara (2016–2017)
Therapy Game by Meguru Hinohara (2017–2018)

Shōsetsu Dear+
Yes, No, or Maybe? by Michi Ichiho and Lala Takemiya (since 2014)

Chéri+

Given by Natsuki Kizu (since 2013)
Candy Color Paradox by Isaku Natsume (2010–2012 in Dear+; moved to Chéri+ in 2014)

References

External links
 Dear+ official website
 Shōsetsu Dear+ official website
 Chéri+ official website

1997 establishments in Japan
Magazines established in 1997
Monthly manga magazines published in Japan
Yaoi manga magazines
Magazines published in Tokyo